The 2017 Women's EuroHockey Junior Championship was the tenth edition of the Women's EuroHockey Junior Championship II, the second level of the women's European under-21 field hockey championships organized by the European Hockey Federation. It was held from 16 to 22 July 2017 in Hradec Králové, Czech Republic.

Russia won their second Women's EuroHockey Junior Championship II title and were promoted to the 2019 Women's EuroHockey Junior Championship together with the runners-up Belarus who Russia defeated 3–0 in the final.

Qualified teams
Participating nations have qualified based on their final ranking from the 2014 competition.

Preliminary round

Pool A

Pool B

Fifth to eighth place classification
The points obtained in the preliminary round against the other team are taken over.

Pool C

First to fourth place classification

Bracket

See also
 2017 Men's EuroHockey Junior Championship II
 2017 Women's EuroHockey Junior Championship

References

Women's EuroHockey Junior Championship II
Junior 2
International women's field hockey competitions hosted by the Czech Republic
Sport in Hradec Králové
EuroHockey Junior Championship II
EuroHockey Junior Championship II
EuroHockey Junior Championship II